Koldo is a male given name. Notable people with this name include:

 Koldo Aguirre (1939–2019), Spanish football player
 Koldo Álvarez, Andorran football player
 Koldo Fernández (born 1981), Spanish cyclist
 Koldo Gil (born 1978), Spanish cyclist
 Koldo Gorostiaga Atxalandabaso (born 1940), Spanish politician
 Koldo Izagirre (born 1953), Spanish writer
 Koldo Mitxelena (1915–1987)
 Koldo Serra, Spanish director
 Koldo Zuazo (born 1956), Basque linguist

Basque masculine given names